Jackson Township is one of twelve townships in Dubois County, Indiana. As of the 2010 census, its population was 2,125 and it contained 844 housing units.

History
Jackson Township was originally built up chiefly by Germans.

Geography

Unincorporated towns
 Bretzville
 Kyana
 Saint Anthony
 Saint Marks
(This list is based on USGS data and may include former settlements.)

Adjacent townships
 Marion Township (north)
 Hall Township (northeast)
 Jefferson Township (east)
 Ferdinand Township (south)
 Patoka Township (west)
 Bainbridge Township (northwest)

Major highways
  Indiana State Road 64
  Indiana State Road 162

Cemeteries
The township contains three cemeteries: Bretzville, Dungan and Main.

References
 
 United States Census Bureau cartographic boundary files

External links
 Indiana Township Association
 United Township Association of Indiana

Townships in Dubois County, Indiana
Jasper, Indiana micropolitan area
Townships in Indiana